The 1980 CONCACAF Pre-Olympic Tournament was the fifth edition of the CONCACAF Pre-Olympic Tournament, the quadrennial, international football tournament organised by the CONCACAF to determine which national teams from the North, Central America and Caribbean region qualify for the Olympic football tournament.

The top two teams, champions, Costa Rica and the United States, qualified for the 1980 Summer Olympics. However, the United States boycotted the Olympic games and they were replaced by Cuba.

Qualification

The three berths were allocated as follows:
The three winners from their respective regional zone at the qualifying stage

Qualified teams
The following teams qualified for the final tournament.

1 Only final tournament.

Final round

Qualified teams for the Summer Olympics
The following four teams from CONCACAF qualified for the 1980 Summer Olympics.

1 Bold indicates champions for that year. Italic indicates hosts for that year.

References

1980
Oly
Football qualification for the 1980 Summer Olympics